The Electoral division of North Esk was an electoral division in the Tasmanian Legislative Council of Australia. It existed from 1855 to 1901, when it was abolished.

Members

See also
Tasmanian Legislative Council electoral divisions

References
Past election results for North Esk

Former electoral districts of Tasmania
1901 disestablishments in Australia